The 2010–11 Wright State Raiders men's basketball team represents Wright State University in the 2010–11 NCAA Division I men's basketball season. Their head coach is Billy Donlon, serving his first year. The Raiders play their home games at the Nutter Center and are members of the Horizon League.

Roster

Schedule

|-
!colspan=9 style=| Exhibition

|-
!colspan=9 style=| Regular season

|-
!colspan=9 style=| Horizon League tournament

References

Wright State Raiders
Wright State Raiders men's basketball seasons
Wright
Wright